The 2022 Bahia state election took place in the state of Bahia, Brazil on 2 October 2022. The elections saw voters choose a Governor and Vice Governor, one Senator, 39 representatives for the Chamber of Deputies, and 63 Legislative Assembly members. The incumbent Governor, Rui Costa, of the Workers' Party (PT), was not eligible for a third term since he ran for governor in 2014 and 2018. In a significant upset, PT nominee and Secretary of Education Jerônimo led Mayor of Salvador ACM Neto in the first round of elections despite the vast majority of registered opinion polls indicating the leadership or even outright victory of Neto. In the end, Jerônimo obtained 49.45% of valid votes to ACM's 40.8%; less than a percentage point within of winning the election in the first round. Nevertheless, as no candidate obtained a majority of the vote, there will be a second round election on October 30 2022. 

In the election for Federal Senate from the state of Bahia, incumbent Senator Otto Alencar (PSD) whose seat was up for election ran for re-election. and was successfully re-elected with 58.3% of valid votes.

Electoral calendar

Gubernatorial candidates 
Political parties have until August 15, 2022 to formally register their candidates.

Candidates in Runoff

Candidates failing to make Runoff

Senatorial candidates 
Political parties have until August 15, 2022 to formally register their candidates.

Potential candidates

Withdrawn candidates 
 João Leão (PP) - Vice Governor of Bahia since 2015; Federal Deputy from Bahia 1995–2015 and Mayor of Lauro de Freitas 1989–93. The Vice-Governor of Bahia said that the reason he gave up running for the Federal Senate is due to his advanced age and the difficulty in keeping up with the pace of the candidate for the government of Bahia, ACM Neto.
 José Ronaldo (Brazil Union) - Former Mayor of Feira de Santana, former Federal Deputy, and candidate for governor of Bahia in 2018. He decided to coordinate ACM Neto's campaign for governor instead, supporting the coalition candidate Cacá Leão.

Legislative Assembly 
The result of the last state election and the current situation in the Legislative Assembly of Bahia is given below:

Opinion polls

Governor

First round 
The first round is scheduled to take place on 2 October 2022.

2022

2021

Second round 
The second round (if necessary) is scheduled to take place on 30 October 2022.

ACM Neto vs. Jerônimo

ACM Neto vs. João Roma

João Roma vs. Jerônimo

Senator 

2022

Results

Governor

Senator
Cícero Araújo's candidacy is under review and his votes are temporarily annulled.

Notes

References 

Bahia
2022
2022 elections in Brazil